KOSO (92.9 FM) is a commercial radio station licensed to Patterson, California, and serving the Modesto metropolitan area.  The station carries a country radio format and is owned by iHeartMedia, Inc.  Its studios and offices are in Modesto.  On weekdays, KOSO, known as "The Big Dog," carries the nationally syndicated Bobby Bones Show in morning drive time and CMT Nights with Cody Alan overnight.

KOSO has an effective radiated power (ERP) of 3,000 watts and is a Class A station.  The transmitter is off West Hatch Road in Riverdale Park, California, near the Tuolumne River.  (The tower was originally near Mount Oso, from which it got its call sign KOSO.)  KOSO broadcasts in the HD Radio hybrid format.  The HD2 subchannel carried a Top 40 format known as "M Style Radio," but that programming has since been discontinued with the HD2 subchannel being turned off.

History
On June 8, 1966, KOSO signed on the air. It originally broadcast on 93.1 MHz and was powered at 1,100 watts. It was owned by the Sierra-Pacific Radio Corporation, with studios and offices in Modesto.

The station previously had an adult contemporary format and was branded as "KO93". The mainstream AC format continued until the summer of 1995, when the station was rebranded as "B93". As a result, the station shifted to a hot AC format.

In 1997, B93 began to transition towards a modern AC format, adding more alternative rock-leaning artists such as Alanis Morissette, Counting Crows, Gin Blossoms, and The Cranberries to its playlist.

In 2000, Clear Channel Communications, the forerunner to today's iHeartMedia, acquired KOSO. Clear Channel needed the station to bring a "move-in station" to the Sacramento radio market.

On June 1, 2009, at midnight, KOSO moved from 93.1 MHz to 92.9 MHz as a result of the start of 93.1 FM KHJQ Pollock Pines, near Sacramento, which began broadcasting in June 2009. That station today is KFBK-FM, co-owned with KOSO.

On October 2, 2012, KOSO shifted its format to Hot AC, branded as "Radio 92.9".  On March 2, 2015, KOSO returned to its "B93" branding.

On July 1, 2016, at 12 noon, KOSO changed its format from hot AC to country music, branded as "92.9 The Big Dog".

References

External links

OSO
Country radio stations in the United States
Modesto, California
Mass media in Stanislaus County, California
Radio stations established in 1961
1961 establishments in California
IHeartMedia radio stations